Sambangsan is a mountain in the counties of Pyeongchang and Yeongwol, Gangwon-do in South Korea.

Geology

The Sambangsan Formations has diverse homogeneous, purple, to greenish gray fine sandstone and siltstone. Sandstones are generally massive, greenish gray, and fine grained, showing small-scale bands and are poorly to moderately sorted (Chough 90).
They are mainly composed of fine to very fine quartz, feldspar, mica, and opaque minerals, and show foliations. Quartz are mainly made out of 70 - 80% of framework grains and the upper parts of the formation are formed by fauna of the middle Middle Cambrian. The occurrence of fine sandstone layers is suggestive of deposition in relatively shallow to deep-water environments (Chough 93).
Sambangsan Formation consists of a lot of light grey, green or brown, massive or thick-bedded sandstone (upper part) and red or green shale and sandy shale. Extreme tribes of Middle Cambrian age occur in light brown, thin-bedded medium to coarse-grained, micaceous sandstone beds in the upper part of the formations (Chough 22).

See also
 List of mountains in Korea

Notes

References
 
"Chough, Sung Kwun. "Geology and Sedimentology of the Korean Peninsula." Google Books. Elsevier, 2013. Web. 07 Mar. 2016.
"Sanbangsan Mountain." Imagine Your Korea. Korea Tourism Organization, n.d. Web.
"Sanbangsan Mountain." Jeju. Jeju Self Governing Province, n.d. Web.
"Welcome to JEJU." Welcome to JEJU |. Jeju Tourism Organization, 2015. Web. 07 Mar. 2016.

Mountains of South Korea
Mountains of Gangwon Province, South Korea